ESL Pro League Season 4 (shortened as EPL Season 4) was a Counter-Strike: Global Offensive tournament run by ESL. It was the fourth season of the ESL Pro League, and had an overall prize pool of $750,000 . For the first time, the Finals took place in South America – São Paulo, Brazil, from October 28 to October 30. Teams from two continents, North America and Europe competed in fourteen team leagues to attempt to qualify for the Finals. Europe's season began with FaZe Clan defeating Team X (which later formed into Heroic) and ended with Team Dignitas defeating Virtus.pro in a best of three 6th place decider. North America's season started with Cloud9 defeating Team Liquid and ended with Immortals defeating Echo Fox. In the finals, Cloud9 defeated SK Gaming 2–1 to become the ESL Pro League Season 4 Champions and take home $200,000 prize money; this upset would also mark the first time a North American won an international premier event since iBUYPOWER won ESEA Season 16 - Global Invite Division in 2014.

Format
The format was slightly different to the previous renditions of the tournament.

Each continent featured the top 11 teams from ESL Pro League Season 3, one team from the ESEA Season 21: Premier Division Qualifier, one team from the ESL Pro League Season 3 Relegation, and one team from the Wild Card Qualifier. Teams within each continent played each other twice to determine the top four qualifiers to the Finals in Brazil. There was be a total of nine weeks in this phase of the tournament. All games were played online.

Teams that placed seventh to eleventh are automatically invited to next season's ESL Pro League. 12th and 13th place are invited to Season 4's Relegation and 14th place will be placed in the ESEA Premier Season 24.

The Finals consisted of twelve teams, six from Europe and six from North America. These teams were separated into two groups. The group stage consisted of every team in each group playing against each other. The top three teams in each group moved on to the Playoffs. The knockout stages were a best of three format. All games in the Finals were played offline. The top team in each group received a bye and automatically moved onto the Semifinals. The other four teams played in the Round of Six. The winners of those two games moved on to the Semifinals, and the winner of the Semifinals moved onto the Finals.

Teams

North America

Broadcast Talent
Host
  Tom "Tsquared" Taylor
Commentators
  Sam "DaZeD" Marine
  John "BLU" Mullen
  Jason "moses" O'Toole
Analysts
  Steve "Ryu" Rattacasa
  Erik "da_bears" Stromberg
Observers
  Heather "sapphiRe" Garozzo
  DJ "Prius" Kuntz

Standings
The final standings are shown below. Each team's in-game leader is shown first. The rosters that are shown are the rosters that were in place by the end of the season. For instance, Skyler "Relyks" Weaver left  in the middle of the season and was replaced with Jacob "kaboose" McDonald. Thus, kaboose's name is shown below and Relyks's name is not shown.

Europe

Broadcast Talent
Host
  Alex "Machine" Richardson
Commentators
  Henry "HenryG" Greer
  Mitch "Uber" Leslie
  Lauren "Pansy" Scott
  Matthew "Sadokist" Trivett
Analyst
  Janko "YNk" Paunović
Observers
  Alex "Rushly" Rush

Standings
The final standings are shown below. Each team's in-game leader is shown first. The rosters shown reflect the rosters as they were by the end of the season. For instance, Timothée "DEVIL" Démolon was replaced with Christophe "SIXER" Xia on Team EnVyUS midway through the season. Therefore, SIXER's name is shown instead of DEVIL's.

1Finn "karrigan" Andersen was on the Astralis until the end of the regular season. However, FaZe Clan acquired the Danish in-game leader before the São Paulo Finals. Since Astralis did not qualify for the Finals and FaZe did, karrigan's name is shown in both Astralis's and FaZe's rosters.

2Team EnVyUs was forced to forfeit its first map to Virtus.pro as two of its players could not log on to their accounts. The second map was played as normal.

Finals
The finalized teams are shown below. Each team's world ranking for October 24, 2016 is also shown.

Broadcast Talent
Host
  Beatriz "Bia" Bauer
Desk Host
  Alex "Machine" Richardson
Commentators
  Henry "HenryG" Greer
  John "BLU" Mullen
  Jason "moses" O'Toole
  Matthew "Sadokist" Trivett
Analysts
  Chad "SPUNJ" Burchill
  Janko "YNk" Paunović
  Luis "peacemaker" Tadeu
Observers
  Heather "sapphiRe" Garozzo
  Davis DJ "Prius" Kuntz
  Alex "Rushly" Rush

Group stage

Group A

1Team Liquid takes Renegades's spot in the EPL Finals due to Renegades opting out of the trip to Brazil and instead headed to play in the ELEAGUE Major 2017 Asia Minor in Johor Bahru, Malaysia.

2 Fnatic withdraw from the tournament due to personal problems

Group B

Playoffs

Bracket

Round of 6 Scores

Semifinals Scores

Finals Scores

Finals standings

References

2016 in esports
ESL Pro League
Esports in Brazil
Sport in São Paulo (state)